Myrsini Aristidou is a Cypriot film director based in Paris and Cyprus. She is best known for her short films Semele (2015) and Aria (2017).

Life and career
Myrsini was born and raised in Limassol, Cyprus. She holds a BFA in Film and History of Art from Pratt Institute in New York, and an MFA in Film Directing from NYU Tisch School of the Arts.

Myrsini's short film, Semele (2015), premiered at the Toronto International Film Festival, Tribeca Film Festival, and at the Berlinale 2016, where it won the Special Jury Prize of the Generation KPlus. In 2017, her short film, Aria, had its world premiere at the Venice Film Festival and then at the 2018 Sundance Film Festival.

Myrsini is currently in development of her first feature film, Iris, and was a fellow of the Cannes Cinéfondation Residence, the TIFF Talent Lab, the Berlinale Talents, and the Torino Script Lab.

Filmography

References

External links
 
 

Living people
Cypriot film directors
Cypriot women film directors
Cypriot film producers
Year of birth missing (living people)